Ngāti Pāhauwera is a Māori iwi of Aotearoa.

See also
List of Māori iwi

References